Jim Lee is a comic book artist.

Jim Lee may also refer to:

Jim Lee (photographer), photographer and film director
Jim Lee (broadcaster), radio announcer
Jim Lee (record producer)
Jim Lee (businessman), see Trey Gowdy#Electoral history

See also
James Lee (disambiguation)
Jimmy Lee (disambiguation)